Eleftheres (Greek: Ελευθερές) is a Greek village in Larissa. It is located at a distance of 11 km from the city of Larissa, bordering villages Koilada, Terpsithea and Mesorachi. It is built at an altitude of 95 meters

Name 

The village is also called Eleftherai (in Katharevousa).

History 

Remains of the Neolithic and Classical period were found in the hilly area southwest of the village.

People 

The main occupation of the villagers is agriculture and livestock. In recent years Eleftheres has seen major residential development. Over the past 10 years its population increased from 421 people (2001 census) to 520 (2011 census).

Religious fairs 

At the religious fair in memory of Saint Charalampos (10/2) people have the opportunity to taste traditional boiled rice, snacks and local wine. There are also two other religious fairs in memory of Cosmas of Aetolia (24/8) and St. Bessarion.

Photographic material

References 

Villages in Greece
Populated places in Larissa (regional unit)